Tampereen-Viipurin llves-Kissat is a Finnish football club from Tampere. As of 2017 are playing in the Kolmonen league.

They play their home matches in the Tammelan Stadion, which was opened in 1931.

The name of the club was changed to Viipurin Ilves (‘Lynx of Viipuri’) in 1934, and as a result of the Winter War, the club was relocated in Tampere in 1940. However, there already was a club called Ilves in Tampere, so club reverted to the name Ilves-Kissat in December 1944.

IKissat Tampere were promoted to the Mestaruussarja, the top flight of Finnish football, for the 1949 season, and we're champions in 1950. They were relegated in 1951.

In 1974 Ilves-Kissat and Tampellan Palloilijat merged with Ilves Tampere, which now became fully involved in football. Ilves-Kissat discontinued its activities in the sport, but on lower tiers of Finnish football it is, in a way, represented by its sister club, Kissalan Pojat (namesake of the Katzenjammer Kids).

In the autumn of 2004, with the club's football team in 6th Division the management of the club decided to make a push for higher tiers, and in the autumn of 2010 the club achieved promotion to Kakkonen, i.e. 3rd tier. For the 2011 season, Ilves-Kissat entered an arrangement whereby they became the farm team for FC Haka of Valkeakoski, but the season ended with relegation to 3rd Division.

Season to season

15 seasons in Veikkausliiga
16 seasons in Ykkönen
8 seasons in Kakkonen
14 seasons in Kolmonen
1 seasons in Nelonen
5 seasons in Vitonen
3 seasons in Kutonen
1 seasons in Seiska

Further reading
 Matti Wacklin: Sydämenasiana Ilves. Tampere: Ilves ry, 2006.

References

External links
 Ilves-Kissat football team home page

Football clubs in Finland
Ilves-Kissat
Sport in Turku
Sport in Vyborg